Potok pri Vačah is a small settlement east of Vače in the Municipality of Litija in central Slovenia. The area is part of the traditional region of Upper Carniola. It is now included with the rest of the municipality in the Central Sava Statistical Region.

Name
The name of the settlement was changed from Potok to Potok pri Vačah in 1953.

Ljubek Castle

The remains of the Romanesque Ljubek Castle (or Lebek Castle), probably dating to the 11th century and first mentioned in written documents dating to 1220, can be found south of the settlement. The castle was destroyed in the peasant revolt of 1515 and was later rebuilt. Today, it is only a ruin.

References

External links

Potok pri Vačah on Geopedia

Populated places in the Municipality of Litija